USA-235, also known as Advanced Extremely High Frequency 2 or AEHF-2, is a military communications satellite operated by the United States Air Force. It is the second of six satellite to be launched as part of the Advanced Extremely High Frequency program, which replaced the earlier Milstar system.

Satellite description 
The USA-235 satellite was constructed by Lockheed Martin Space, and is based on the A2100 satellite bus. It will be used to provide super high frequency (SHF) and extremely high frequency (EHF) communications for the United States Armed Forces, as well as those of the United Kingdom, the Netherlands, and Canada.

Launch 
USA-235 was launched by United Launch Alliance, aboard an Atlas V 531 flying from Space Launch Complex 41 (SLC-41) at the Cape Canaveral Air Force Station (CCAFS). The launch occurred at 18:24 UTC on 4 May 2012, first placing the satellite in a parking orbit of 185 kilometers by 905 kilometers. The satellite was successfully deployed in this orbit 51 minutes after launch.

See also 

 2012 in spaceflight

References 

Military communications
Communications satellites of the United States